Inguromorpha arcifera is a moth in the family Cossidae. It is found in North America, where it has been recorded from Texas.

The wingspan is 28 mm for males and 38 mm for females. Adults have been recorded from April to May.

References

Natural History Museum Lepidoptera generic names catalog

Hypoptinae